Donde hay violencia, no hay culpa is a 1744 zarzuela by José de Nebra, premiered in Madrid.

Recording
 Donde hay violencia, no hay culpa - Alicia Amo, Natalie Perez, Giulia Semenzato, Judit Subirana, Los Elementos, Alberto Miguelez Rouco Glossa 2022

References

1744 operas
Zarzuelas
Spanish-language operas
Baroque compositions
Operas